Methoxyethane, also known as ethyl methyl ether, is a colorless gaseous ether.  Unlike the related dimethyl ether and diethyl ether, which are widely used and studied, this mixed alkyl ether has no current applications.  Its utility as an anesthetic and solvent have been investigated.

References

Dialkyl ethers
Ether solvents